Ivan DeBlois Combe (April 21, 1911 – January 11, 2000) was the American inventor of personal-care products, most notably Clearasil and Odor Eaters. In 1949 he established his eponymous company Combe Incorporated in White Plains, New York.

Early life and career 
Ivan DeBlois Combe was born in Fremont, Iowa, on April 21, 1911. Combe graduated from Northwestern University in 1933, and earned a law degree from the Northwestern University School of Law in 1936.

He became a salesman for Hydrox Ice Cream and the Wilbur Shoe Polish company before moving to New York City to work for the Young & Rubicam advertising agency. He later joined Pharmacraft, a drug manufacturer, but in 1949, left his vice president position to create his own company.

Death 
Combe died in Greenwich, Connecticut on January 11, 2000.

Legacy 
After his death, Northwestern University named the Combe Tennis Center in his honor.

References 

1911 births
2000 deaths
20th-century American businesspeople